Stephen Coen is a Gaelic footballer who plays for Hollymount-Carramore and the Mayo county team.

Coen led both Mayo minor team and Mayo under-21 team to All-Ireland titles as captain in 2013 and 2016, respectively. Coen also captained the UCD senior team to win the 2017/18 Sigerson Cup. Coen also played with his club Hollymount-Carramore in the 2015/16 All-Ireland Intermediate Club Football Championship final, which they lost.

Coen replaced Lee Keegan as a substitute in the 2016 All-Ireland Senior Football Championship Final, and was also used as a substitute for Colm Boyle in the 2017 All-Ireland Senior Football Championship Final.

He advanced to starting positions in the teams that lost the 2020 and 2021 All-Ireland Senior Football Championship Finals, each by five points.

He was appointed captain of the Mayo senior team ahead of the 2022 season.

References

1995 births
Living people
Mayo inter-county Gaelic footballers